KIRQ (106.7 FM) is a commercial radio station located in Hailey, Idaho, broadcasting to the Twin Falls, Idaho, area. KIRQ airs a hot adult contemporary format branded as "Q106.7".

External links

IRQ
Hot adult contemporary radio stations in the United States